Michael Barry (born 16 March 1991) is a New Zealand cricketer. He plays first-class and List A cricket for Auckland. He made his Twenty20 debut for Auckland on 4 December 2016 in the 2016–17 Super Smash. In September 2018, he was named in the Auckland Aces' squad for the 2018 Abu Dhabi T20 Trophy.

References

External links
 

1991 births
Living people
New Zealand cricketers
Auckland cricketers
Cricketers from Auckland